The 1988 Indonesia Open is one of the 10 best badminton tournaments in Asia. Held in Jakarta from 20 to 24 July 1988. The total prize money is $135,000.

Final results

References 

Indonesia Open (badminton)
Indonesia